Warden of the Mint was a high-ranking position at the Royal Mint in England from 1216 to 1829. The warden was responsible for a variety of minting procedures and acted as the immediate representative of the current monarch inside the mint. The role of warden changed greatly through history with the original task being the receiving, assay and payment for bullion, while later evolving into more of an administerial role.

The office received a yearly emolument of £500 and up until 1685 wardens were given tenure meaning many wardens died while in office. Although technically subordinate to the Master of the Mint whose jobs was act as a contractor to the crown many wardens advanced later on to become Master of the Mint with some wardens holding both offices at the same time.

The most illustrious holder of the office of Warden of the Mint was Isaac Newton, who was warranted to this position on the recommendation of his friend, Montagu,  Chancellor of the Exchequer in 1698.  In 1699 however, Newton undertook the office of Master of the Mint, which was far more lucrative, as well as potentially more technically challenging. After the death of the final warden Sir Walter James, 1st Baronet in 1829 the office was abolished having existed for 613 years.

Warden of the Mint

See also
Münzwardein
Master of the Mint

References

Bibliography

External links
Galileo Project Biography of Newton
Royal Mint Biography of Newton
Institute of Historical Research – Wardens of the Mint

HM Treasury
Ceremonial officers in the United Kingdom
Production of coins